The Waiaua River is a river of the Taranaki Region of New Zealand's North Island. It flows southwest from the slopes of Mount Taranaki to reach  the Tasman Sea at Ōpunake.

See also
List of rivers of New Zealand

References

South Taranaki District
Rivers of Taranaki
Rivers of New Zealand